Neil Donald Maxwell (born  12 June 1967 in Lautoka, Fiji) is a former Fijian cricketer who now plays in Australia. Maxwell was a right-handed batsman who bowled right-arm fast-medium.

Maxwell played for Canterbury, New South Wales and Victoria cricket teams in the 1990s. He played for Fiji in the 1990 ICC Trophy in the Netherlands. He is currently the player agent for star cricketers Brett Lee and Michael Hussey, as well as formerly Adam Gilchrist.

Maxwell is the CEO for the marketing firm Insite Organisation and was formerly the CEO for the Indian Premier League franchise, the Kings XI Punjab.

His figures of 5/10 against Singapore in the 2001 ICC Trophy are the best in that competition by a Fijian.

See also
 List of Victoria first-class cricketers
 List of New South Wales representative cricketers

References

1967 births
Living people
Fijian cricketers
Canterbury cricketers
New South Wales cricketers
Victoria cricketers
Fijian cricket administrators
Melbourne Cricket Club cricketers
Sportspeople from Lautoka
Fijian people of British descent
Australian cricket coaches